Calumet Motorsports is an American aircraft parts manufacturer and former aircraft manufacturer based in Lansing, Illinois and founded by Tom Milton. The company specializes in the design and manufacture of autogyro parts and at one time produced whole aircraft kits for amateur construction in the US FAR 103 Ultralight Vehicles category.

History
The company was formed in the 1970s as Calumet Aeronautics, nicknamed Cal Aero and acted as a dealer for "Airguide" wind meters. In buying the assets of the SnoBird Aircraft Company the company acquired the rights to the Snobird Explorer ultralight autogyro design and put the aircraft back into production, changing the company name to Calumet Motorsports. The Calumet version was first flown in May 1997 and produced through the late 1990s and early 2000s when it was noted as a low-cost, entry level aircraft.

The aircraft was commercially successful, but required additional investment to expand production and instead the line was sold. When the SnoBird line came up for sale again later the company bought the seat fuel tank business, doing business as Calumetair. Later when parts designer Dick Wunderlich died, the company added the Wunderlich prerotator and rotorbrake to their product line.

Milton is also a Federal Aviation Administration Designated Airworthiness Representative (DAR).

Aircraft

References

External links

Aircraft manufacturers of the United States
Ultralight aircraft
Homebuilt aircraft
Autogyros